Columbia Park was a baseball stadium in Philadelphia, U.S.

Columbia Park may also refer to the following places in the U.S.:

 Columbia Park, Torrance, California, a park
 Columbia Park, Minneapolis, a neighborhood in Northeast
 Columbia Park (Portland, Oregon), a park 
 Columbia Park (Altoona), Pennsylvania, a former baseball field
 Columbia Park (Tri-Cities), Washington, a park comprising Columbia Park East and Columbia Park West
 Columbia Park (Marshfield, Wisconsin), a park